The Sussex County Board of County Commissioners is a body of five people, called commissioners that govern Sussex County, New Jersey. They are elected at large by popular vote. The last democrat to serve on the board was Howard Burrell who served on the board from 2000 to 2002.

Structure 

The board is the legislative body of Sussex County, New Jersey. They are responsible for the adoption of a budget for the county. The board oversees, and creates policies for the county's Departments of Central and Shared Services, Engineering and Planning, Finance and Library Services, and the Department Health and Human Services. Among those departments they also operate multiple boards, and committees. They also oversee the boards of estimates for Sussex County Technical School, and Sussex County Community College. The board also has the authority over the county's infrastructure. Meetings are held in Newton, New Jersey in the Sussex County Administrative Center. Each year during the reorganization meetings commissioners choose two members from the board to serve as director and deputy director. The current director is Commissioner Herb Yardley, and the current deputy director is Commissioner Sylvia Petillo.

Party affiliation

Sessions

2019 
In April, the board approved a resolution that would put a question on the ballot asking the Sheriff to ignore the sanctuary state directive sent out by State Attorney General Gurbir Grewal in November 2018. Grewal sent a letter to Sussex County Clerk Jeff Parrott telling him not to put the question on the ballot. Sheriff Mike Strada in turn asked Attorney General William Barr for legal assistance. In July the board hired state Republican Chairman Doug Steinhardt as legal counsel in fighting the state Attorney General.

Previous Sessions

Former Members 
  Alfred Littell , member of the board in 1956 and member of the New Jersey Senate from 1943 to 1953.

  Howard Burrell , elected in 1999 and most recent democrat to serve on the board.

  Vic Marotta , on the board from 1988 to 1991 and served as Mayor of Vernon, New Jersey from 2011 to 2015.

  Jeff Parrott , on the board from 2008 to 2010 lost the 2010 primary to current Assemblyman Parker Space, has served as County Clerk since 2011.

  Phil Crabb , served on the board from 2008 to 2017, and later served on the Franklin Borough Council in 2018.

  Jonathan Rose  on the board from 2016 to 2018 and lost re-election to Dawn Fantasia in the 2018 republican primary.

  Carl Lazzaro , in office from 2016 to 2018 and lost the 2018 GOP primary to Josh Hertzberg.

References

Sussex County, New Jersey
County government in New Jersey